EPBM may refer to:
electroplated Britannia metal
extensor pollicis brevis muscle